Nirej (also Romanized as Nīrej, Nayrej, Neyarīj, Nīārej, Nīārīj, Nīrej, and Nīrīj; also known as Nīrach and Tīzaj) is a village in Kharaqan-e Gharbi Rural District, Central District, Avaj County, Qazvin Province, Iran. Following the 2006 census, its population was 151, making up 43 families.

References 

Populated places in Avaj County